Caetano da Silva Nascimento, nicknamed "Veludo"  (7 August 1930 – 26 October 1979) was a Brazilian football player. He played for the Brazil national football team at the 1954 FIFA World Cup finals.

Veludo played club football for Fluminense, Canto do Rio, Santos, Atlético Mineiro, Madureira and Renascença, winning the Campeonato Carioca in 1951 with Fluminense and the Campeonato Mineiro in 1958 with Atlético Mineiro.

References

1930 births
1979 deaths
Brazilian footballers
Brazil international footballers
1954 FIFA World Cup players
Association football goalkeepers
Footballers from Rio de Janeiro (city)